Miller Field may refer to:

Places

In the United States
 Jessee/Miller Field, Trinity College, Hartford, Connecticut
 Zell B. Miller Field, Young Harris, Georgia
 Les Miller Field, a baseball venue in Chicago, Illinois
 Miller Field (baseball), a baseball stadium in Owensboro, Kentucky
 Joe Miller Field at Cowgirl Diamond, Lake Charles, Louisiana
 Miller Field (airport), an airport in Valentine, Nebraska (IATA: VTN, ICAO: KVTN)
 Miller Field (Las Cruces), New Mexico; an American football stadium
 Miller Field (Staten Island, New York), a park and former military base in New Dorp, Staten Island, New York
 Miller Field, a ball park on the campus of Brigham Young University in Provo, Utah; see Larry H. Miller Field
 Larry H. Miller Field, a baseball stadium on the campus of Brigham Young University in Provo, Utah
 Gail Miller Field, a softball stadium on the campus of Brigham Young University in Provo, Utah
 Marty L. Miller Field, a baseball venue in Norfolk, Virginia

Other places
 Melfort (Miller Field) Aerodrome (TC LID: CJZ3), Melfort, Saskatchewan, Canada; an airport
 Miller oilfield, a North Sea oil and gas field

See also

 Bowden Golf Course, built on the site of Miller Field, a former airfield in Macon, Georgia
 Miller Park (disambiguation)
 
 Miller (disambiguation)
 Field (disambiguation)